CLF may refer to:

 CenturyLink Field, a stadium in Seattle, Washington
 Center for a Livable Future
 Chain link fence
 Chlorine monofluoride (ClF)
 Church of the Larger Fellowship, worldwide Unitarian Universalist congregation
 Clear Sky Lodge Airport's FAA code
 RAF Coltishall's IATA code
 Cleveland-Cliffs Inc., a business firm specializing in the mining of iron ore in the United States
 Clifton Forge (Amtrak station)'s station code
 The Congressional Leadership Fund, dedicated to electing Republicans to the U.S. House of Representatives
 Conservation Law Foundation, a legal environmental advocacy organization
 Common Log Format - A standardized text file format usually associated with web server logs
 Common Look and Feel, a Government of Canada Internet standard
 Commonwealth Literary Fund (1908–1974), an Australian Government body
 Unidad de Fomento, ISO 4217 code of a Chilean unit of account